The Avon Grove School District (AGSD) is a publicly funded, K-12 school district located in Chester County, Pennsylvania, serving over 5,000 students in four schools: Penn London Elementary School (K–2), Avon Grove Intermediate School (3–6), Fred S. Engle Middle School (7–8) and Avon Grove High School (9–12).

Geography
 Franklin Township
 London Grove Township
 London Britain Township
 New London Township
 Penn Township
Avondale and West Grove are two boroughs within London Grove Township. Due to the closeness of the two boroughs (less than three miles in distance from each other), it was natural that the area became known as Avon Grove.

Schools within the district
Penn London Elementary School (K-2)  
Avon Grove Intermediate School (3–6) 
Fred S. Engle Middle School (7–8) 
Avon Grove High School (9–12) 
Avon Grove Charter School

Co-curricular activities 
At Avon Grove School District, co-curricular opportunities begin in third grade, promoting academic achievement while enhancing teaching and learning. The District offers a large variety of clubs, activities and sports.

References

External links
Official website
Charter School Official website

School districts in Chester County, Pennsylvania